The Draco Foundation was legally formed in 2010 but conceived by the New Zealand Resilience Trust in 2006 as part of its mission to assist in the development of resilience among communities throughout New Zealand. The Draco Foundation promotes democracy and the preservation of natural justice through two operational arms: Council Watch and the National Residents' Associations Database.

These activities, along with the Foundation itself, are non-partisan and funded through private donations.  All the work performed by the Trust is adopts a community-centric approach and is run by volunteers.

Draco Foundation aims to educate the public about how the law works, especially around local government.  They undertake research, hold forums and conferences, publish articles, and bring people from the civil society sector together.  The Trust operates in the civil society sector, mainly with residents associations.

Draco funds Council Watch - a website that improves transparency, accountability and best practice in local government - and also the National Residents' Association Database.

Notable Activities
In 2010 the Trust convened the first national conference for New Zealand residents' and ratepayers' associations, at the Grand Hall of parliament buildings, Wellington.

That same year the Trust appealed a decision by the Charities Commission to refuse registration as a charitable entity.  The appeal was rejected by the court in a decision by Ronald Young J, handed down on 15 February 2011.

Historical Reference
The Foundation is named after Draco, the first lawgiver of ancient Athens.  His contribution to democracy was considerable, as he replaced oral laws (known only to a special class, arbitrarily applied and interpreted) with written laws; thus made known to all literate citizens, who could make appeal to the rulers of Athens for injustices.

Draco's legal code was very stringent (leading to the term "Draconian").  However the Draco Foundation does not advocate for draconian laws in the modern sense of the word.  Rather it supports the application of the law equally to all citizens and organisations: including agents of the Government - in the true spirit of Draco's approach to justice.

Services
Some of the services that the Draco Foundation provides are:
Support for residents associations, neighbourhood associations and community associations
Research into the local government sector
Advocacy for excellence in community governance

External links
Draco Foundation portal site
Council Watch
National Residents' Association Database
TVNZ - Crown Observer appointment 'could be unlawful'
Scoop - Crown Law Asked To Investigate Minister’s Decision
Otago Daily Times - Christchurch symptomatic of system
Capital Times - WCC Angers Residents
Canterbury Transition News - St Albans Host Special Guest
Scoop - Community leaders positive on future of democracy
Voxy - Charitable Trust Appeals Charities Commission Decision In High Court

References

Community development organizations
Foundations based in New Zealand